Khilek, Mae Rim is a tambon (subdistrict) of Mae Rim District, in Chiang Mai Province, Thailand. In 2014 it had a population of 7,476 people.

Administration

Central administration
The tambon is divided into eight administrative villages (mubans).

Local administration
The area of the subdistrict is covered by the subdistrict municipality (thesaban tambon) Khilek (เทศบาลตำบลขี้เหล็ก)

References

Tambon of Chiang Mai province
Populated places in Chiang Mai province